Ulpius is a genus of assassin bugs (family Reduviidae), in the subfamily Harpactorinae.

Species
 Ulpius bicolor Distant, 1879
 Ulpius bigibbulus Horváth, 1914
 Ulpius festivus Distant, 1879
 Ulpius grandituber Bergroth, 1906
 Ulpius guttiventris Horváth, 1914
 Ulpius nodosipes (Signoret, 1860)
 Ulpius obscurus Distant, 1879
 Ulpius tuberosus Horváth, 1914
 Ulpius tumidiceps Horváth, 1914

References

Reduviidae
Cimicomorpha genera